Brienne-sur-Aisne (literally Brienne on Aisne) is a commune in the Ardennes department in northern France.

Sister cities
It is the sister town of Michiana Shores, Indiana.

See also
Communes of the Ardennes department

References

Communes of Ardennes (department)
Ardennes communes articles needing translation from French Wikipedia